Jimbricky Norman Ochero also referred to as Norman Jimbricky Ochero is the male elected member of the eleventh Parliament of Uganda (2021 to 2026) in the 2021 general election representing Abim District, Labwor constituency. Before joining the eleventh Parliament of Uganda, he served as the Local Council Five Chairperson of Abim district. He was elected to the parliament on the ticket of National Resistance Movement (NRM). In the parliament of Uganda, he serves on the Committee on Public Accounts (Local Government)

See also 

 List of members of the eleventh Parliament of Uganda
  Parliament of Uganda
 Janet Grace Akech Okorimoe
 Abim District
 National Resistance Movement

External links 

  Website of the Parliament of Uganda

References 

Living people
Members of the Parliament of Uganda
National Resistance Movement politicians
Year of birth missing (living people)